Lieutenant Frederick Cecil Stanton  (30 October 1895 – 20 March 1979) was a British World War I flying ace credited with seven aerial victories.

Military service
Stanton was born in Emberton, Buckinghamshire, the son of William Charles and Kate Dunkley Stanton, who ran the post office there. He enlisted on 2 September 1914 into the 6th Battalion of the Oxfordshire and Buckinghamshire Light Infantry, and served in France from 22 July 1915 to 16 March 1917.

On 24 November 1916 he was awarded the Distinguished Conduct Medal. His citation read:
12636 Lance Corporal F. C. Stanton, Oxf. & Bucks. L.I.
"For conspicuous gallantry in action. When the enemy began sniping at his men from a trench to his right rear, he immediately took some of his men and bombed the enemy down this trench, thereby allowing the neighbouring troops to capture the position."

Stanton was promoted to sergeant on 3 September 1916, and on 1 May 1917 he was given permission to wear the Croix de guerre awarded to him by France.

He then joined the Royal Flying Corps as a cadet, being commissioned as a temporary second lieutenant (on probation) on 26 September 1917, and was confirmed in his rank on 18 March 1918.

He was first posted to No. 24 Squadron, but on 29 May was transferred to No. 22 Squadron. Between 10 July and 27 August, flying a Bristol F.2b two-seater fighter with Lieutenant Clifford Tolman as his observer/gunner, he accounted for seven enemy aircraft, three driven down out of control, and four destroyed.

Stanton was transferred to the RAF unemployed list on 14 June 1919.

List of aerial victories

References

1895 births
1979 deaths
People from the Borough of Milton Keynes
Oxfordshire and Buckinghamshire Light Infantry soldiers
Royal Flying Corps officers
Royal Air Force personnel of World War I
British World War I flying aces
Recipients of the Distinguished Conduct Medal
Recipients of the Croix de Guerre 1914–1918 (France)
British Army personnel of World War I
Military personnel from Buckinghamshire